Wesley Plaisier (born 4 March 1990) is a Dutch professional darts player who is currently playing in the Professional Darts Corporation events.

Career
He attended European Q-School in 2019, but never got farther than the last 32, missing out on a Tour Card. He did then qualify as the one of the Association Member qualifiers for the 2019 European Darts Open in Leverkusen, Germany. He lost 6–3 to James Wade in the second round.

He also qualified for the 2019 Dutch Darts Masters, but he lost 6–1 to Brendan Dolan. A third European Tour qualification of 2019 was secured at the 2019 European Darts Matchplay, but Jamie Hughes beat him 6–5.

Plaisier performed well at the 2022 German Darts Grand Prix, beating Jim Williams, Joe Cullen and Dirk van Duijvenbode to reach the quarter-final stage, where he was beaten in a sudden-death leg by the tournament's eventual winner, Luke Humphries.

Plaiser won the 2022 Six Nations Charity Singles beating Scott Taylor in the final 5–4.

World Championship results

WDF
 2023:

References

External links

Dutch darts players
Professional Darts Corporation associate players
1990 births
Living people